More than Yesterday (More Country Songs & City Hits) is a studio album by Slim Whitman, released in 1965 on Imperial Records.

It entered the Billboard country chart for one week in March 1966.

Track listing 
The album was issued in the United States and Canada by Imperial Records as a 12-inch long-playing record, catalog numbers LP-9303 (mono) and LP-12303 (stereo).

Charts

References 

1965 albums
Slim Whitman albums
Imperial Records albums